Guerguerat is a small village in the far south west of Western Sahara,  from the border with Mauritania and  from the Atlantic Ocean. The village is under the control of Morocco. The Moroccan passport control stamp bears the name of Bir Gandouz, a nearby village.
Morocco sees this frontier post as the southernmost barrier protecting the European Union.

The area between the Moroccan frontier post and the Mauritanian frontier is controlled by the Sahrawi Republic.

In January 2015, the  Polisario established a military presence in La Güera on the seaside, but apparently did not yet start controlling passports of people transiting to Mauritania.

Since February 2017, the Gendarmerie Nationale (الدرك الوطني) started to hoist flags and turn back Moroccan lorries showing the contour of Morocco including Western Sahara.

The importance of Guerguerat to Morocco lies in two aspects: Moroccan exports of vegetables to Mauritania (especially to Nouadhibou) run through this border station and it is the only way for Moroccans to leave their country by land without a visa to another country.
The importance of Guerguerat to the SADR lies in the fact that this is the only location where it can exert pressure on Morocco by isolating it from Mauritania.

Morocco took military action in the area on 13 November 2020, in an attempt to enforce free movement of goods and people between Moroccan-controlled territory and Mauritania. The pro-independence Polisario Front declared an end to the 1991 ceasefire, while Morocco denied there had been any armed clashes between the sides and said the truce remained in place.

Climate

References

Populated places in Western Sahara
Disputed territories in Africa